Charlotte's Web is a 2006 American fantasy comedy-drama film based on the 1952 novel of the same name by E. B. White. Directed by Gary Winick and written by Susannah Grant and Karey Kirkpatrick, it is the second film adaptation of White's book, and a live-action/CGI remake of the 1973 animated version produced by Hanna-Barbera Productions. The film stars Dakota Fanning, Kevin Anderson, and Beau Bridges, with voices provided by Dominic Scott Kay, Julia Roberts, Steve Buscemi, John Cleese, Oprah Winfrey, Thomas Haden Church, André Benjamin, Cedric the Entertainer, Kathy Bates, Reba McEntire, and Robert Redford. Danny Elfman composed the film's score.

Produced by Walden Media, Jordan Kerner's The K Entertainment Company and Nickelodeon Movies, the film premiered in Australia on December 7, 2006 and was released theatrically by Paramount Pictures on December 15, 2006 in the United States. The film received mostly positive reviews from critics, yet was only modestly and commercially successful. The movie grossed $83 million at the US box office and $61 million elsewhere for a worldwide total of $144 million against an $85 million budget, as well as grossing an additional $95.2 million in home media sales.

Plot
During springtime on a farm in Somerset County, Maine, young Fern Arable discovers her father John about to kill a runt of a litter of newborn pigs. She successfully begs her father to spare the piglet's life; Fern names him Wilbur and nurtures him lovingly. The next morning, Fern sneaks Wilbur into her school desk and she lies to the teacher who forces her to open her desk and sends her to the principal's office.

When Wilbur has matured, Fern is regretfully forced to take him to her uncle Homer Zuckerman's barnyard. Mrs. Arable feels slightly concerned for Fern's behavior and one night, prevails upon Fern to stay home, do her homework and go straight to bed without visiting Wilbur. During this time, Wilbur feels abandoned and is left yearning for companionship, but is refused by the other barn animals - a comedic, mischievous, rebellious, misunderstood, and "potentially dangerous" rat named Templeton; a serious and steadfast sheep named Samuel; a fun-loving and kindly goose couple named Gussy and Golly; two beautiful and laid-back cow sisters named Bitsy and Betsy; and a cowardly and humorous horse named Ike - until he is befriended by Charlotte A. Cavatica, a beautiful barn spider who lives in the space above Wilbur's sty in the Zuckermans' barn.

When the other animals reveal to Wilbur that he will be prepared for dinner by Christmas, Charlotte promises to hatch a plan guaranteed to save Wilbur's life. With the help of Templeton, Charlotte convinces the Zuckerman family that Wilbur is actually quite special by spelling out descriptions of him in her web such as "Some pig", "Terrific", "Radiant" and "Humble" in the opening to the barn for the Zuckermans to see. These descriptions are even posted in newspapers that the whole town read and came out to see. 

Eventually, the Arables, Zuckermans, Wilbur, Charlotte and Templeton go to a fair where Wilbur is entered in a contest. While there, Charlotte produces an egg sac containing her unborn offspring while Wilbur, despite winning no prizes, is later celebrated by the fair's staff and visitors, making him too prestigious to justify killing him. Exhausted from laying eggs, Charlotte cannot return home because she is dying. Wilbur bids an emotional farewell to her as she remains at the fair and dies shortly after his departure, but he manages to take her egg sac home with the help of Templeton.

Wilbur then lives to witness his first Christmas and by the next spring, hundreds of Charlotte's offspring emerge; most of the young spiders soon leave, but three named Joy, Aranea and Nellie stay and become Wilbur's friends.

Cast
Dakota Fanning as Fern Arable
Kevin Anderson as John Arable
Beau Bridges as Dr. Dorian
Louis Corbett as Avery Arable
Essie Davis as Phyllis Arable
Siobhan Fallon Hogan as Edith Zuckerman
Gary Basaraba as Homer L. Zuckerman
Nate Mooney as Lurvy, the Zuckermans' farmhand
Julian O'Donnell as Henry Fussy

Voices
Dominic Scott Kay as Wilbur the Spring Pig
Julia Roberts as Charlotte A. Cavatica the Spider
Steve Buscemi as Templeton the Rat
John Cleese as Samuel the Sheep
Oprah Winfrey as Gussy the Goose
Cedric the Entertainer as Golly the Gander
Kathy Bates as Bitsy the Cow
Reba McEntire as Betsy the Cow
Robert Redford as Ike the Horse
Thomas Haden Church as Brooks the Crow
André Benjamin as Elwyn the Crow
Abraham Benrubi as Uncle the Pig
Briana Hodge as Nellie, one of Charlotte's daughters
Maia Kirkpatrick as Joy, one of Charlotte's daughters
Jennessa Rose as Aranea, one of Charlotte's daughters
Sam Shepard as the Narrator

Production
Charlotte's Web was produced without any involvement from E. B. White's estate. It was the first film based on a book by E. B. White since 2001's The Trumpet of the Swan.

Major shooting was completed in May 2005. It was filmed on location in Greendale, Victoria and suburbs in Melbourne, Australia. The fair scene in the story was filmed in Heidelberg in Melbourne, Australia at Heidelberg West Football Club's football ground. The school scenes were filmed at Spotswood Primary School.

The talking-animal visual effects were done by various visual effect studios such as Rising Sun Pictures, Fuel International, Proof, Rhythm and Hues Studios (which also animated 1999's Stuart Little, another film based on an E. B. White book, as well as its 2002 sequel Stuart Little 2), Digital Pictures Iloura and Tippett Studio. The visual effects supervisor for the film was John Berton, who noted that a live-action version of Charlotte's Web has become much more practical in recent years due to advances in technology. Winick "was adamant" that Charlotte and Templeton (the film's two entirely computer-generated characters) should be realistic and not stylized, although they did give Charlotte almond-shaped eyes. John Dietz, visual effects supervisor for Rising Sun Pictures, notes that there was a debate over whether to give her a mouth and that in the end, they decided to have her chelicerae move in what he describes as being almost like a veil as if there were a mouth behind it.

The three geese which appeared in the movie were procured local to the Nillumbik Shire, Victoria from the Burford Family Farm in Hurstbridge. These were hand raised by the Burford Family, before being sold to the producers for the sum of $50AUD and euthanized in order to allow the movie's taxidermist to prepare the geese for filming. This arrangement led to controversy following the release of the film after one of the breeders was accused of deliberately conducting a "ram-raid" of the local ANZ.

Release
The film was scheduled for a June 2006 release, but was pushed back to December 15, 2006 to avoid competition with two other films from Nickelodeon Movies - Nacho Libre and Barnyard - as well as Over the Hedge (which also featured Thomas Haden Church in the cast) and Cars among other films.

Home media
Charlotte's Web was released on DVD on April 3, 2007 in the United States and Canada and on May 28, 2007 in the United Kingdom. It was then released on Blu-ray on March 29, 2011 alongside The SpongeBob SquarePants Movie. Nearly 10 years later, the film was re-released on DVD on January 24, 2017.

Reception

Box office
The film debuted in third place at the box office with only $11 million. Having spent 14 weeks in theaters, the film grossed $82 million domestically and $61 million overseas for a worldwide total of $144 million before closing on March 22, 2007.

Critical response
Review aggregation website Rotten Tomatoes gives the film a 78% "Certified Fresh" rating based on 148 reviews with an average rating of 7.0/10, and a 62% audience recommendation based on 250,000+ reviews. The site's critical consensus reads, "Kids will be entertained by the straightforward plot and cute animals, and adults will be charmed by how quiet and humble the production is, a fine translation of E.B. White's genteel prose." On Metacritic the film has a score of 68 out of 100 based on 28 critics, indicating "generally favorable reviews". Audiences polled by CinemaScore gave the film an average grade of "A" on an A+ to F scale.

Michael Medved gave the film three-and-a-half stars out of four, calling it "irresistible" and "glowing with goodness". Medved also said that Dakota Fanning's performance was "delightfully spunky". Owen Gleiberman of Entertainment Weekly stated that the film was "a bit noisy" but praised the director for putting "the book, in all its glorious tall-tale reverence, right up on screen." He later went on to say that "What hooks you from the start is Dakota Fanning's unfussy passion as Fern." Conversely, Colm Andrew of the Manx Independent gave the film a score of 6/10, saying that the main problem was "the ultra-cute characterisation of Wilbur, resulting in half the audience rooting for his demise" although overall it was "a competent retelling of a classic story that won't offend".

The film won the 2006 Critics' Choice Award for Best Live-Action Family Film, and Fanning won the Blimp Award for Favorite Movie Actress at the 2007 Kids' Choice Awards.

Awards

Soundtrack

Charlotte's Web: Music from the Motion Picture was released by Sony Classical on December 5, 2006. In addition to the instrumental score by Danny Elfman (composing his second film for Nickelodeon Movies, following Nacho Libre, which released the same year), the soundtrack includes the song "Ordinary Miracle" by Sarah McLachlan, which she herself performed during the opening ceremonies of her hometown Vancouver Winter Olympics. A CD compilation of "Music Inspired by the Motion Picture" was issued on December 12, 2006.

Video game 

A video game based on the movie, developed by Backbone Entertainment and published by Sega, was released on December 12, 2006, for the Game Boy Advance, Nintendo DS, and PC.

Another game based on the film was released in Europe for the PlayStation 2 by Blast Entertainment on April 5, 2007.

References

External links 

  archived at Wayback Machine
 Official website at Nick.com, archived at Wayback Machine
 Official website at Walden Media, archived at Wayback Machine
 
 
 

2006 films
2000s English-language films
2000s children's fantasy films
2000s children's comedy films
2000s fantasy comedy films
American children's fantasy films
American children's comedy films
American fantasy comedy films
Films about friendship
Films about pigs
Films about spiders
Films based on novels by E. B. White
Films based on children's books
Films directed by Gary Winick
Films with screenplays by Karey Kirkpatrick
Films with screenplays by Susannah Grant
Films scored by Danny Elfman
Films set on farms
Films set in Maine
Films shot in Melbourne
Nickelodeon Movies films
Paramount Pictures films
Walden Media films
2000s American films
Remakes of American films